World Sports Values Summit for Peace is an international conference which is aimed at  pursuing the value of the sports and discussing and disseminating how support can socially contribute to peace and respect for human rights.

History 
The first World Sports Values Summit for Peace was held in London under the theme of “Olympic Values: London and Beyond”  from  June 29 through July 1, 2012.  The event highlighted the three overarching themes discussed at the two-day symposium: the meaning of Olympic values in the twenty-first century; how to realize them more effectively in sport, at the Games and beyond;  and how to leverage them for broader goals, nationally and internationally, including human right and peace. Related to the first Summit, a global essay contest  was also held, in which 265 students from 61 countries shared their ideas about Olympic values and how to realize them through sport, culture, education, and other public initiatives.

The second Summit, World Sports Values Summit for Peace in Tokyo,  was held at Hotel New Otani Tokyo on July 18 and 19. It was aimed at highlighting the positive roles that sport can play in furthering the cause of peace and human development. It was declared at the end of the event that the World Sports Values Summit for Peace will be  periodically held  thereafter too.

The third Summit, World Sports Values Summit for Peace and Development was held on May 22 and 23, 2014  at the Headquarters of the United Nations.  Delegates from a number of nations discussed about the constructive strategy to overcome challenges we face today through sports.  It was announced that a partnership had been engaged between  International Sports Promotion Society, the host organization of the second Summit, and United Nations Alliance of Civilizations, the host organization of the third Summit.

List

References

External links 
 ISPS (in Japanese)
 UNAOC
 UN WEB TV
 World Sports Values Summit for Peace and Development

International Sports Promotion Society
International conferences
Sports event promotion companies
Politics and sports